Saigoneer is a digital news site based in Ho Chi Minh City, Vietnam. Founded in 2012 by Brian Letwin and Alberto Prieto, Saigoneer hosts daily news reporting, original, and branded content in English, Vietnamese, and Korean. In January 2018, Saigoneer launched the Saigoneer Podcast, one of the first English podcasts produced in Vietnam. 

Saigoneer profiles street food culture in Saigon (Hẻm Gems) and Hanoi (Ngõ Nooks).

References 

Mass media in Ho Chi Minh City
Vietnamese news websites
Mass media in Hanoi
Vietnamese companies established in 2012
Companies based in Ho Chi Minh City